The 2009–10 Welsh National League was the sixty-fifth season of the Welsh National League (Wrexham Area). The Premier Division was won by Rhos Aelwyd, who gained promotion to the Cymru Alliance.

Premier Division

League table

Division One

League table

External links
Welsh National League

2009-10 Premier Division
3